Finance Ministers of Bihar, India

See also
 List of chief ministers of Bihar

Finance Ministers
Bihar
Lists of government ministers of Bihar